Cinnamate hydroxylase may refer to:
 Trans-cinnamate 2-monooxygenase
 Trans-cinnamate 4-monooxygenase